Colias pelidne, the pelidne sulphur or blueberry sulphur, is a butterfly in the family Pieridae found in North America. Its range includes British Columbia across Canada as far east as Newfoundland and south to Idaho, Montana, and Wyoming.

Flight period is from late June until early August.

Wingspan is from 33 to 44 mm.

Larvae feed on Vaccinium spp. and Gaultheria humifusa. Adults feed on flower nectar.

Subspecies
Listed alphabetically.
C. c. pelidne
C. p. skinneri Barnes, 1897
C. p. minisni Bean, 1895 forma? accepted as a species by Josef Grieshuber & Gerardo Lamas

References

External links
 Butterflies of America C. pelidne skinneri images
Butterflies of America C. pelidne pelidne images

pelidne
Butterflies of North America
Butterflies described in 1829